Melaleuca haplantha is a shrub in the myrtle family, Myrtaceae and is endemic to the south-west of Western Australia.  It was first described as a new species in 1988 when Bryan Barlow undertook a review of Melaleuca cuticularis and found it to include 13 separate species.

Description

There is usually only one flower in the head but sometimes up to three flowers. The stamens are arranged in five bundles around each flower with 17 to 24 stamens per bundle.

Taxonomy and naming
Melaleuca haplantha was first formally described in 1988 by Bryan Barlow in Australian Systematic Botany as a new species. The specific epithet (haplantha) is derived from Ancient Greek words meaning "single" and "flower", referring to the single-flowered inflorescence.

Distribution and habitat
This melaleuca occurs between the New Norcia, Mukinbudin, Stirling Range and Hopetoun districts in the Avon Wheatbelt, Esperance Plains and Mallee biogeographic regions. It grows in clay and gravelly loam in winter-wet soil in kwongan or woodland.

Conservation status
Melaleuca haplantha is listed as "not threatened" by the Government of Western Australia Department of Parks and Wildlife.

References

haplantha
Myrtales of Australia
Plants described in 1988
Endemic flora of Western Australia